The Tehran Municipality Palace (Persian: عمارت شهرداری تهران) was a building in Toopkhane square, Tehran, Iran. It served as the office for Tehran municipality for years before being destroyed in 1969.

History 
After the 1921 coup in Iran that led to Zia ol Din Tabatabaee becoming prime minister of Iran, an Armenian named Kasbar Ipegian became the acting mayor of Tehran. Ipegian ordered the construction of a municipality building in Toopkhane square to centralize affairs in the city. After Reza Khan was crowned Shah of Iran in 1925, Karim Buzarjomehri became the mayor of Tehran and the building was completed. The building was destroyed after more than 4 decades of existence in 1969 for unknown reasons.

References 

Demolished buildings and structures in Iran
Pahlavi Iran
Buildings and structures demolished in 1969